Abercairny is an estate in the Scottish region of Perth and Kinross. It had the distinction of a short visit by Queen Victoria 12 September 1842, when she wished to see the mansion house, then under construction.
It is included in the Inventory of Gardens and Designed Landscapes in Scotland.

References

Villages in Perth and Kinross
Inventory of Gardens and Designed Landscapes